Masters of the Universe (sometimes referred to as the He-Man or She-Ra series) is a sword and planet-themed media franchise created by Mattel. The main premise revolves around the conflict between He-Man (the alter ego of Prince Adam) and Skeletor on the planet Eternia, with a vast lineup of supporting characters in a hybrid setting of medieval sword and sorcery, and sci-fi technology. A follow-up series, She-Ra: Princess of Power revolves around He-Man's sister She-Ra and her rebellion against The Horde on the planet Etheria. Since its initial launch, the franchise has spawned a variety of products, including multiple lines of action figures, six animated television series, several comic series, video games, books and magazines, a daily newspaper comic strip, and two feature films (one animated, one live action).

Series overview and main characters

He-Man and the accompanying Masters of the Universe franchise would make their debut in 1981 with Mattel's release of the original "Masters of the Universe" 5.5-inch action-figure toy line. Masters of the Universe, often abbreviated as MOTU, would begin its mythos through the minicomics that accompanied the toys throughout the 1980s. These initial mini comics were soon followed by several children's books and issues of DC Comics. However, the Masters of the Universe franchise would become best known through Filmation's groundbreaking He-Man and the Masters of the Universe animated series. Debuting in the fall of 1983, the Filmation series ran 130 episodes over two seasons until November 1985.

Since its inception, Masters of the Universe has usually placed its focus on the two primary characters, the blond muscular He-Man, "the most powerful man in the Universe," and his nemesis, the evil skull-faced, blue-skinned sorcerer Skeletor and their many moral-themed encounters on the planet Eternia. Set in a hybrid world of sword and sorcery and technological sci-fi, He-Man battles with Skeletor to prevent him from conquering Eternia and discovering the secrets of Castle Grayskull—a mysterious ancient fortress with a skull-shaped facade, containing great power and magic. As with many toy franchises that have been transferred to several different media, there are a number of story differences between the various versions of Masters of the Universe. In most continuities from the Filmation series onward, He-Man is the secret identity of Prince Adam, the son of King Randor and Queen Marlena, the ruling royal family of Eternia. Adam becomes He-Man by holding aloft his magic Power Sword and uttering the words "By the power of Grayskull…" and serves as the protector of good on Eternia. He is first given this ability by the Sorceress of Castle Grayskull, a powerful magic user and mystic guardian of the castle, who in many depictions is able to transform herself into the falcon Zoar. Upon Adam's transformation into He-Man, his cowardly green pet tiger Cringer becomes the mighty Battle Cat, a giant armored beast that He-Man often rides into battle.

He-Man's most prominent allies include Man-At-Arms, a wise loyal veteran soldier and inventor; and his adopted daughter Teela, a spirited and skillful female warrior, often portrayed as captain of the Eternian Royal Guard and a potential love interest of He-Man/Prince Adam. The childlike Trollan magician Orko also often features as one of He-Man's closest allies; as does Stratos, a flying bird-man from the kingdom of Avion; Ram-Man, a stout dimwitted warrior with springlike legs and a large helmet that encloses his head and upper torso; and Man-E-Faces, an actor with face-changing abilities.

Skeletor is originally described as an evil being from another dimension and in some later MOTU lore as a disfigured and vengeful relative of the royal family, known as Keldor. From his lair on Snake Mountain, Skeletor would assemble his "Evil Warriors" to assist in his various schemes to conquer Eternia. These core minions usually include Beast Man, an orange-furred, apelike master of beasts; Mer-Man, an aquatic fishlike ocean warlord; Evil-Lyn, a powerful sorceress and one of Skeletor's most feared and competent associates; Trap Jaw, an iron-jawed criminal with a mechanical arm that can be fitted by a various assortment of weapons; and Tri-Klops, a mercenary swordsman with a rotating three-eyed visor.

The series overall would feature a wide and ever-expanding cast of heroic and villainous characters added to the toy line, the Filmation cartoon, and other media; with the franchise far outshining prior expectations, continuing to grow through 1983 and 1984. The release of the animated cartoon movie He-Man and She-Ra: The Secret of the Sword in the spring of 1985 introduced He-Man's twin sister She-Ra (with her secret alter ego Princess Adora) and the arch-villain Hordak (leader of the Evil Horde and the former master of Skeletor) on the planet Etheria. Stemming from the animated movie, Filmation went on to produce 93 episodes of the series She-Ra: Princess of Power, which ran until the end of 1987, along with the He-Man & She-Ra: Christmas Special. Other main characters of the She-Ra series would include Swift Wind, winged unicorn and alter ego of She-Ra's trusty steed Spirit; Light Hope, mystical living beam of light and mentor to She-Ra; and her Great Rebellion allies Glimmer, magically inclined onetime leader of the rebellion; Bow, skilled archer and the main male protagonist of the series; Kowl, Bow's owllike, rainbow-eared companion; Madame Razz, absent-minded witch with her sarcastic sentient Broom; and Queen Angella, Glimmer's mother and angel-winged queen of the Bright Moon; along with Hordak's spell-casting witch Shadow Weaver; shape-shifting spy Imp; bumbling bug-eyed henchman Mantenna; Force Squad captain Catra; evil scientist Modulok; beastly warrior Grizzlor; energy-draining Leech; and thuggish henchwoman Scorpia.

Various children's books, magazines, comics, read-along records/cassette tapes, and other merchandise were also released worldwide around this time, with much of the content based primarily on the Filmation He-Man and She-Ra series. The live-action film Masters of the Universe was released in 1987 by Cannon Films, starring Dolph Lundgren and Frank Langella. The later 1980s mini comics, Marvel comics series, and UK magazine comics continued the adventures of He-Man and She-Ra past the end of the two Filmation series. However, popularity had waned by the end of 1987 and a planned continuation of the original toy line under the heading of "The Powers of Grayskull" (set in ancient Eternia, featuring the villain King Hiss and He-Man's ancestor He-Ro) was started, but eventually scrapped.

He-Man would be brought back in 1989 in an entirely new and space-based cartoon series and toy line known as "The New Adventures of He-Man." Only He-Man and Skeletor would return as major characters to join the battle between Galactic Guardians and Space Mutants on the planet Primus. Jetlag Productions would go on to produce 65 episodes of the New Adventures cartoon, with a few mini comics and adventure magazines also created for this new series. Ultimately, though, the series would not be as successful and the entire franchise would go on a hiatus for more than a decade.

After some success with a "Commemorative Series" rerelease of the classic action figures in 2000, Mattel relaunched the toy line with all-new action figures, playsets, and vehicles, sculpted by Four Horsemen Studios in 2002. As part of the relaunch, a modern updated animated series was also created by Mike Young Productions, lasting for 39 episodes; featuring He-Man and his ensemble of heroic warriors, now called the "Masters of the Universe," battling Skeletor's minions and, later, King Hiss, the ancient and evil lord of the Snake Men. Characters such as Mekaneck, heroic warrior with a mechanical extending neck; Buzz-Off, heroic beelike flying Andreenid warrior; Clawful, large villainous crab-like henchman; Whiplash, evil reptilian Caligar with a deadly tail; Stinkor, foul-smelling mutated Paleezean; and many others would gain more prominent backstories during this series. Several volumes of comic books were also produced to go along with the series by Image Comics and MVCreations. Although popular with longtime fans and collectors (with mini-statue figures being released by NECA until 2007), the new series failed to catch on with a larger audience and was canceled in 2004.

From 2008 to 2020, a new assortment of Masters of the Universe action figures has been released under the banner of "Masters of the Universe Classics." Primarily geared toward the collector's market, the series made up an entirely new story in "Classics bios" and used various elements from previous Masters of the Universe lore, many times changing those elements to suit the new story, with characters from all previous incarnations (and also featured a continuation of the original mini comics line). DC Comics would soon follow suit and relaunch a new grittier, contemporary version of the Masters of the Universe franchise, releasing various new comic book series from 2012 until 2020; featuring crossovers with the DC Comics Universe, ThunderCats, and a new origin for She-Ra, culminating in Hordak's conquest of Eternia.

In 2020, Mattel released a new line of 5.5" scale action figures, vehicles and playsets under the Masters of the Universe Origins line.

Netflix and DreamWorks released an animated series entitled She-Ra and the Princesses of Power in 2018, which released five seasons until 2020. This was followed in 2021 by Masters of the Universe Revelation, a new Netflix animated series produced by Kevin Smith.

History and versions of the franchise

Origin of the franchise
Mattel began development of He-Man and the Masters of the Universe in the late 1970s with Conan the Barbarian–inspired concepts from Roger Sweet, Mark Taylor, Donald F. Glut, and several other contributors. The catalyst for the creation of He-Man began in 1976, when Mattel's CEO Ray Wagner declined a request to produce a toy line of action figures based on the characters from the George Lucas film Star Wars, with the film's toy rights being acquired by Kenner instead. Upon the commercial success of the film trilogy and all related merchandise during the next few years, Mattel attempted to launch several unsuccessful toy lines, none of which captured the public's imagination or made a significant dent in the toy market.

In the race to design the next hit action figure, Roger Sweet, a lead designer working for Mattel's Preliminary Design Department throughout much of the 1970s and 1980s, according to his book Mastering the Universe: He-Man and the Rise and Fall of a Billion-Dollar Idea, was the first to conceptualize the idea of He-Man. However, this is not officially acknowledged by Mattel, and authorship of the He-Man character has been subject to debate. According to various former Mattel designers, Roger Sweet drew inspiration for the designs of his first He-Man prototypes from fantasy drawings of Mattel packaging designer Mark Taylor, which included a drawing of a He-Man-like character called Torak.

Roger Sweet presented the He-Man concept to Ray Wagner at the Mattel Product Conference, in the form of three large three-dimensional plaster prototype models, which Sweet dubbed the "He-Man Trio." These prototypes were molded from extensively modified Big Jim action figures (Battle Cat would also be adapted from a tiger in the Big Jim toy line). The He-Man Trio models were an axe-wielding barbarian, a tank-headed soldier, and a spaceman with a Boba Fett–like helmet. Out of the three concepts, the barbarian version of He-Man was chosen to be the basis of the toy line (this original trio-prototype idea was released around 30 years later as the figure Vykron, and the barbarian concept on its own as Vikor, in the "Masters of the Universe Classics" line).

"The only way I was going to have a chance to sell this [to Wagner] was to make three 3D models—big ones. I glued a Big Jim figure [from another Mattel toy line] into a battle action pose and I added a lot of clay to his body. I then had plaster casts made. These three prototypes, which I presented in late 1980, brought He-Man into existence. I simply explained that this was a powerful figure that could be taken anywhere and dropped into any context because he had a generic name: He-Man!"

—Roger Sweet

Originally set under the working title "Lords of Power," the name "Masters of the Universe" came into being when it was suggested that the former name of the toy line was too religious in nature. The roster of characters would soon expand past the main hero, He-Man, and Mark Taylor would draw inspiration for the series main villain, Skeletor, from his 1971 sketch entitled The King of Styx, along with early renderings of his characters Demo-Man and D-Man. Taylor would create preliminary designs for several other original characters as well, with additional ideas or direction from Mark Ellis and Paul Cleveland, among others, but the premise behind the toy line had not yet been fully established. The backstory of He-Man was first conceptualized for special mini-comic books that Mattel marketing director Mark Ellis promised distributors would accompany the toys. Mattel had DC Comics mock up a comic book, with the earliest storybooks written by Donald F. Glut. With major distributor Toys "R" Us concerned that "five-year-olds don't read", Mark Ellis then first proposed the idea of an animated TV special. This would eventually lead to a meeting with Filmation head Lou Scheimer and the creation of the He-Man and the Masters of the Universe animated series.

Earlier in 1980, the rights-holders of Conan the Barbarian had been negotiating the character's toy rights with Mattel and they entered into an agreement the following year regarding characters from the 1982 Conan movie. However, with Mattel introducing the Masters of the Universe toy line in 1982, the rights-holders sued Mattel claiming the character was an infringement on the character of Conan. Mattel eventually won the lawsuit and after legal agreements were dissolved, it was stated that the toy line was never intended for the Conan film. However, some Conan influence can be seen, as Roger Sweet has claimed to have drawn some inspiration from the paintings of Frank Frazetta, a fantasy artist with many works depicting Conan the Barbarian, when creating He-Man.

Early action figures and comics

Original action figures and mini comics (1981–1982)
The "Masters of the Universe" toy line was created by Mattel in 1981, and first released to stores in 1982 as 5½-inch action figures (as opposed to the 3¾-inch size used by Kenner's Star Wars and Hasbro's G.I. Joe: A Real American Hero lines). The two main characters, He-Man ("the most powerful man in the universe") and his arch-enemy Skeletor ("evil lord of destruction") were the first released in action figure form, along with other core characters of the series: Man-At-Arms ("heroic master of weapons"), Beast Man ("Skeletor's savage henchman"), and Battle Cat ("He-Man's fighting tiger").

Later on that year, the first wave of action figures in 1982 would also include Teela ("heroic warrior goddess"), Mer-Man ("evil ocean warlord"), Stratos ("heroic winged warrior"), and Zodac ("the cosmic enforcer"). The Teela action figure was originally proposed as representing both the Sorceress character (when wearing the figure's "snake armor") and the Teela character (when without the "snake armor"), as Mattel believed there would not be enough demand for two female action figures in the initial wave. Alongside the first wave of figures were the Battle Ram ("mobile launcher") and Wind Raider ("assault lander") vehicles and the playset Castle Grayskull ("fortress of power and mystery"). These first figures as well as Castle Grayskull were primarily designed by Mark Taylor, although the final production sculpt of the original He-Man action figure was completed by Tony Guerrero and the first vehicles were designed by Ted Mayer.

Brief descriptions of the characters would appear on the packaging and box art (with illustrations by Errol McCarthy, Rudy Obrero, William Garland, William George, and others). However, the lore of Masters of the Universe would be first fully explored through the mini-comics that accompanied the action figures throughout the duration of the line (with 49 distinct comics being issued from 1981 until 1987). The original four mini comics, He-Man and the Power Sword, The King of Castle Grayskull, Battle in the Clouds, and The Vengeance of Skeletor were made by Mattel in 1981 and written by Donald F. Glut, with artwork by Alfredo Alcala. He-Man is introduced in the first mini comic, He-man and the Power Sword, as a wandering barbarian, leaving behind his jungle tribe on Eternia. The world of Eternia is initially depicted as dealing with the aftermath of a great war that has devastated once-powerful civilizations, leaving behind their fantastical machinery and weapons. The events of the war have also opened a rift between dimensions, which has allowed the evil warlord Skeletor to travel into Eternia. This inaugural incarnation of Skeletor sets his sights on obtaining both halves of the Power Sword (originally split in two in these early stories), in order to gain entry into the ancient Castle Grayskull (depicted, in these early comics, as being inhabited by the ghostly "Spirit of Castle Grayskull"). The main premise being that whoever attains control of Castle Grayskull will gain the power to become Master of the Universe. To combat Skeletor, He-Man is given special powers, armor, and weapons by the Sorceress (she has green skin in her debut appearance and is wearing the "snake armor" that came with the original Teela action figure, instead of adorning her more familiar birdlike attire, as seen in the Filmation series). He-Man (not yet with the dual identity of Prince Adam) is supported in these initial stories by his heroic allies: Battle Cat (without the dual form of Cringer), Man-At-Arms, Teela, and Stratos, the winged warrior (who erroneously came fighting on the side of Skeletor in the initial mini-comic). Skeletor, in turn, enlists the help of the brutish apelike Beast Man and fishlike Mer-Man to battle He-Man or his heroic warriors.

Second wave of action figures and mini comics (1983)
Other major characters introduced the following year in these early waves of action figures included He-Man's allies Ram Man ("heroic human battering ram"; with spring-loaded legs), Man-E-Faces ("heroic human…robot…monster"; with three alternate faces), and Zoar ("the fighting falcon"; whose sculpt was taken from the Big Jim toy line's "Eagle of Danger Peak"); along with Skeletor's evil warriors Tri-Klops (described on his packaging as "evil and sees everything"; with a three-eyed rotating visor), Trap Jaw ("evil and armed for combat"; with alternate weapons to place in his arm socket), Panthor (Skeletor's "savage cat"; a fuzzy purple adaptation of Battle Cat's toy mold), Screeech (Skeletor's "barbarian bird"; a purple recast of the orange Zoar), Faker ("evil robot of Skeletor"; a blue-skinned clone of He-Man, seldom featured in MOTU media, without an introductory mini-comic during his initial release), and Evil-Lyn ("evil warrior goddess"; the last figure released in this wave, she would not yet feature in any MOTU media until her prominent role in the Filmation animated series). The Attak-Trak vehicle and the Point Dread & Talon Fighter playset were also released in the 1983 line.

This second series, consisting of seven new mini-comics and released in 1982–83, was produced by DC Comics, written by Gary Cohn and featured artwork by Mark Texeira. These mini-comics would devote several issues toward introducing the new action figure characters into the line. Cohn did not continue the same canon as was set in the first four minicomics. He-Man's new ally Ram Man is initially tricked into fighting on the side of Skeletor in He-Man Meets Ram-Man. Man-E-Faces is introduced in The Ordeal of Man-E-faces as an Eternian actor turned into a monster by Skeletor, freed by the Sorceress, only to be magically possessed by three multiple personalities: man, monster, and robot. Skeletor's evil warriors also get their own introductory mini comics, with Tri-Klops as a skilled swordsman/mercenary in The Terror of Tri-Klops and Trap Jaw portrayed in The Menace of Trap Jaw as a criminal from another dimension. In these pre-Filmation stories, the primary characters of Prince Adam, Cringer, Orko, and Evil-Lyn did not yet feature in the series; although the Eternian Palace and Royal Court with King Randor and Queen Marlena (both yet unnamed, looking decidedly older than in the later series) are featured in several of these DC mini-comics, as are the mystical falcon Zoar (not yet an alternate form of the Sorceress) and the Attak-Trak (battle machine, based on the toy, and not yet a robotic-voiced van-like vehicle, as in the Filmation cartoon). The storyline concept of Teela as the secret daughter of the Sorceress (albeit as a clone) and adopted daughter of Man-At-Arms was first introduced at this time as well in the mini comic The Tale of Teela. A special comic and record entitled The Power of Point Dread/Danger at Castle Grayskull was also produced for the Talon Fighter and Point Dread playset.

Additional waves of action figures, creatures, vehicles, and playsets were released every year until 1987, totaling 70 distinct figures in all (including 24 creatures, 12 vehicles, six playsets, and 10 accessories) with the final overseas releases from the original line coming from Italy in 1988. A major proponent of the 1980s action-figure boom, Masters of the Universe figures proved to be very popular and were produced and marketed all over the world. Most of action figures were made in Taiwan and Malaysia. However, Mattel also had production facilities in the United States, Mexico, France, Spain, and joint ventures with Leo Toys of India, Top Toys of Argentina, Estrela of Brazil, Rotoplast of Venezuela and Takara of Japan.

DC Comics – 1980s series (1982–83)

In July 1982, He-Man and the Masters of the Universe would appear for the first time in the pages of DC Comics with DC Comics Presents Issue #47, in the story From Eternia With Death, followed by a special insert comic in many DC's titles from November 1982, entitled Fate is the Killer. In these first two DC MOTU stories, Superman ends up on Eternia, joining with He-Man to combat Skeletor and his minions. He-Man's original DC comic run finished up with a three-issue miniseries at the start of 1983 (all written by Paul Kupperberg, with artwork by Curt Swan and George Tuska). These issues would introduce the Eternian Royal Family, most notably Prince Adam (DC Comics Presents #47), and his transformation into He-Man in the series. This version of Adam, however, was originally depicted wearing a blue vest and portrayed as somewhat of a philanderer, rather than his later more wholesome pink-vest-wearing character. Also unique to these issues, Adam transforms inside the "Cavern of Power," instead of his more famous "By the power of Grayskull!" line. The Sorceress, now residing in the Cavern of Power, is still depicted wearing the Teela Snake Armor, and is often referred to as "The Goddess" throughout the series. Other entries into the Masters of the Universe mythos, such as Cringer as the alter ego of Battle Cat, Zodac as a neutral cosmic enforcer, Stratos as leader of his home world of Avion, and Adam's mother, Queen Marlena, as an astronaut hailing from Earth, were all partly introduced in these early DC issues.

Filmation animated series era

He-Man and the Masters of the Universe – Filmation animated series (1983–84)

In 1983, Masters of the Universe would debut perhaps its most famous incarnation, with the animated series He-Man and the Masters of the Universe. Created by Filmation under the direction of executive producer Lou Scheimer, the cartoon made its television debut on September 5, 1983, with the episode "The Diamond Ray of Disappearance". Running through two seasons, He-Man and the Masters of the Universe was one of the first animated series produced directly for weekday syndication, as opposed to reruns primarily based on Saturday mornings. Totaling 130 episodes, with each season of 65 episodes stretching across 13 weeks, the series last episode, "The Cold Zone," on November 21, 1985.

Similar to the comics that came before, the series is set on Eternia, which is ruled by King Randor and Queen Marlena (visibly younger in age and with more colorful attire than their previous comic versions). Their son, Prince Adam (now wearing his more familiar pink vest), pretends to be somewhat lazy, clumsy, and irresponsible, much like his pet tiger Cringer (depicted in the series as being very cowardly and with the ability to speak). For the first time, Prince Adam is shown to transform into He-Man by holding aloft his magic sword and saying the magic words, "By the power of Grayskull…I have the power!!!" It is revealed in the introduction that Prince Adam's secret identity of He-Man is known only by the Sorceress of Castle Grayskull (now with the familiar birdlike costume, who often takes the form of Zoar the falcon), Man-At-Arms (now sporting a mustache and often referred to by his first name Duncan; he is portrayed as scientific inventor as well as a warrior), and Orko (making his full debut as a mainstay in the franchise, Orko is presented as a floating childlike Trollan magician, often used for comic relief and as a point-of-view character for children). Rounding out the main cast of heroes is Teela (now firmly depicted with red hair, she is the Captain of the Royal Guard, the adopted daughter of Man-At-Arms, and secret child of the Sorceress; who serves as a teasing and semi-antagonistic love interest of Adam and He-Man throughout the series). Also featuring in the series with semi-regularity are Stratos (the flying leader of the bird people of Avion) and Ram-Man (portrayed as a dim-witted but likable bouncing warrior). Appearing with much less frequency in the series are He-Man's recurring allies Zodac (less neutral and more of an omniscient cosmic peacekeeper, often assisting He-Man), Man-E-Faces (presented this time as a master of disguise, an actor who occasionally employs his abilities to help He-Man), Buzz-Off (leader of a race of bee people), Fisto (debuts as powerful loner and adversary of He-Man before joining forces), Mekaneck (loyal warrior with a bionic neck, searching for his lost son), Roboto (robotic alien explorer marooned on Eternia), Sy-Klone (spinning tornado-like warrior, who appears without a backstory), Moss Man (transforming plant being and spy), and several characters that would not receive action-figure releases in the original line such as Lizard-Man, the Royal Archeologist Melaktha, Trollans Dree-Elle and Montork, Avion bird people Delora and Hawke, Adam's grandfather King Miro, Squinch and the Widgets, and the wise and ancient dragon Granamyr.

He-Man's nemesis, the evil wizard Skeletor (now famously portrayed by voice actor Alan Oppenheimer as a cackling and more comedic villain), still wishes to conquer Castle Grayskull and learn of its secrets, but also now desires to take over the royal palace and rule Eternia; often seeking ancient and mysterious beasts and artifacts to try and stop He-Man and his allies. Skeletor often hosts his rogues gallery inside his headquarters, Snake Mountain, gathered around his bone-filled throne, plotting and peering through a magic orb to spy on He-Man and his friends. Often this group of evil minions consists of the cunning female sorcerer Evil-Lyn (making her full debut into the MOTU mythos as Skeletor's most dangerous counterpart in the Filmation series) and his most frequent sidekicks: the bumbling Beast Man (who possesses the ability to control various creatures through telepathy) and the equally inept weapon-armed Trap Jaw. Skeletor's original henchmen in the cartoon also include Mer-Man (with a distinctive gurgling voice portrayal, also by Alan Oppenheimer), Tri-Klops (with a more robotic voice and persona), and Skeletor's purple pet feline Panthor. Other henchmen making a few appearances later in the series are Webstor (one of Skeletor's more intelligent henchmen, often paired with Kobra Khan), Kobra Khan (menacing Repton able to spray sleeping gas from his cobra hood), Two-Bad (bumbling henchman with two often arguing heads), Spikor (depicted as possibly Skeletor's most dimwitted minion in all of the Filmation series), Modulok (deranged and mutated scientist, once known as Galen Nycroft), Clawful (a far more cunning villain in this version than other representations of the character), and Whiplash (appearing the most out of the later henchmen). Some of Skeletor's rogues would appear only once in the Filmation cartoon, such as Faker (appearing only briefly as a magical clone of He-Man before being tossed into the bottomless abyss outside Castle Grayskull), Jitsu (called "Chopper" in the script), Batros, Icer, Fang-Man, Dragoon, and Strong-Arm. Other villains not allied with Skeletor would occasionally appear as well, such as the powerful wizard Count Marzo, the plant-demon Evilseed, Kothos, Shokoti, Negator, and the rabbitlike space pirate Plundor, to name a few.

Despite the limited animation techniques that were used to produce the series, He-Man and the Masters of the Universe was notable for breaking the boundaries of censorship that had severely restricted the narrative scope of children's TV programming in the 1970s. For the first time, a cartoon series could feature a muscular superhero who engage in on-screen combat (although most of the time wrestling-style moves were utilized instead of direct violence). The cartoon was also groundbreaking in that it was produced in connection with marketing a line of toys, as advertising directly to children was controversial during this period. As an attempt to mitigate the negative publicity generated by these controversies, a "life lesson" or "moral of the story" was played at the end of each episode, which was usually tied to the action or central theme of the episode in question (although in the United Kingdom, the closing "morals" were often edited out of the original broadcasts).

The series featured the voice talents of John Erwin, who starred as He-Man/Prince Adam, Beast Man, Ram Man, Webstor, Whiplash, and many others; the aforementioned Alan Oppenheimer, voicing Skeletor, Man-At-Arms, Battle Cat/Cringer, Mer-Man, Buzz-Off, and many others; Linda Gary as much of the female cast with Teela, the Sorceress, Evil-Lyn, and Queen Marlena; and executive producer Lou Scheimer providing the voice work for a multitude of other characters such as Orko, King Randor, Stratos, Trap Jaw, Tri-Klops, Man-E-Faces, Mekaneck, Fitso, Clawful, Kobra Khan, Spikor, and Two Bad, to name a few. The series was often produced by Lou Scheimer and Hal Sutherland and directed by Gwen Wetzler, Marsh Lamore, Lou Kachivas, Steve Clark, Ernie Schmidt, Ed Friedman, and others; with Tom Sito serving as a main storyboard artist, along with Tom Tataranowicz, Warren Greenwood, Robert Lamb, Don Manuel, Bob Arkwright, and many other contributors. Writers on the show included Larry DiTillio, David Wise, Robby London, Michael Reaves, Doug Booth, J. Brynne Stephens, and many others, including early script-writing work from Babylon 5 creator J. Michael Straczynski, Paul Dini of Batman: The Animated Series fame, and one episode, "Battle Cat," by D. C. Fontana of Star Trek fame.

The series, although still popular, would not be renewed for a third season in 1985. However, the characters would make occasional guest appearances in the She-Ra: Princess of Power Series, which was set in the same universe and followed the same continuity. The She-Ra series began with a 5-part animated serial which was later condensed into the animated movie The Secret of the Sword, released theatrically in the spring of 1985 and featuring most of the main characters from both cartoons. The characters would continue to appear in guest roles throughout the She-Ra series, as well as a Christmas Special. The very last appearance of Filmation's He-Man and Skeletor is in one of the final She-Ra episodes, entitled "Assault on the Hive," airing December 13, 1986.

Filmation-era MOTU action figures and mini comics (1984–85)
Sales of the toy line continued to increase with the exposure of the animated series, and new waves of figures and vehicles were produced during this peak of popularity. First introduced into the action figure line in 1984 were new "Battle Armor" versions of He-Man and Skeletor, who could be "battle damaged" when the mechanism on the figure's chest was pressed. These new renditions of He-Man and Skeletor did not appear in the animated series or the mini comics, but several new characters in the Filmation series found releases in these third and fourth waves of action figures. Making their toy-line debuts in 1984 were He-Man's allies Buzz-Off ("heroic spy in the sky"; beelike insectoid warrior with wings), Fisto ("heroic hand-to-hand fighter"; bearded warrior with a large smashing fist as an action feature), and Mekaneck ("heroic human periscope"; featuring an extending bionic neck). The first action figures for Prince Adam ("heroic secret identity of He-Man") and Orko ("heroic court magician"; utilizing a pull-cord feature that sent the figure spinning around when placed on a flat surface) were also produced in this third wave. Skeletor's evil warriors received new recruits as well, with Clawful ("warrior with the grip of evil"; crab-like creature with an oversize pincer for a hand), Jitsu ("evil master of martial arts"; human warrior with a gold chopping hand action feature), Kobra Khan ("evil master of snakes"; reptilian warrior able to be filled with water to spray "poison" mist on his enemies), Webstor ("evil master of escape"; spider-faced warrior with a working grappling hook/backpack pulley system), and Whiplash ("evil tail-thrashing warrior"; reptilian with a rubber tail) all added to the line in 1984. Vehicles produced in 1984 include the Dragon Walker ("sidewinding beast/vehicle"), Road Ripper ("warrior carrier," with a fast-action pull cord), Roton ("evil assault vehicle," with a round rotating outer disc), and Stridor ("heroic armored war horse," often paired with Fisto). The major playset that year was Skeletor's evil stronghold, Snake Mountain (looking quite unlike the Filmation version, with a giant ghoulish face molded into the plastic and a voice-distorting wolf-headed microphone).

Series three of Mattel's MOTU mini comics contained stories similar to the Filmation animated series, with mini comics such as Dragon's Gift, Masks of Power, and Double-Edge Sword adapting stories straight from the first-season episodes of the same name. There were some differences from Filmation, however, as can be seen in The Temple of Darkness mini comic with the Sorceress, now in her birdlike Filmation attire, but in an all-white version of the costume. The mini comics He-Man and the Insect People and The Clash of Arms included many of the new characters from the toy line such as Buzz-Off, Mekaneck, Fisto, Stridor, Webstor, Clawful, and Whiplash; while others such as The Secret Liquid of Life, Slave City, and The Siege of Avion had less to do with the toy line and introduced new original mini-comic characters instead, such as He-Man's childhood friend Prince Dakon, the evil Geldor, the Kobold master Lodar, and Haramesh the demon.

The 1985 wave of action figures again included new versions of He-Man and Skeletor with special action features: Thunder-Punch He-Man (whose backpack could be loaded with plastic ring caps to create a loud "bang" when turning He-Man's waist) and Dragon Blaster Skeletor (which included a small water-squirting dragon chained to Skeletor's armor). Heroic warriors included in the line were Moss Man ("heroic spy and master of camouflage"; a fuzzy pine-scented retooling of the Beast-Man mold), Roboto ("heroic mechanical warrior"; featuring moving gears and multiple weapons that could be inserted into his arm socket), and Sy-Klone ("heroic fist-flinging tornado"; with a dial on his waist allowing his torso to be spun around continuously). Evil warriors in 1985 consisted of Spikor ("untouchable master of evil combat"; covered in purple rubber spikes with a trident for an arm), Two Bad ("double-headed evil strategist"; whose spring-action arms allowed the figure to punch himself in either face), and Stinkor ("evil master of odors"; a foul-smelling reworking of the Mer-Man mold and the only character from the 1985 line that would not make an appearance in the Filmation cartoon). Vehicles produced in this fourth wave were Bashasaurus ("heroic combat vehicle"; with a large bashing club arm), Battle Bones ("collector's carry case" and dinosaur skeleton brought to life in the mini comics), Land Shark ("evil monster/vehicle"; Skeletor's tank with a purple chomping shark mouth), Night Stalker ("evil armored battle steed"; a recolored Stridor toy, often associated with Jitsu), and Spydor ("evil stalker"; Skeletor's giant mechanical spider).

The largest addition to the 1985 Masters of the Universe toy line came in the form of the Evil Horde, whose characters were set to debut in the animated He-Man and She-Ra: The Secret of the Sword motion picture. Although villains in the soon-to-debut She-Ra: Princess of Power animated series, five out of the six initial Evil Horde action figures were produced for the Masters of Universe line instead of the Princess of Power toy line (with the Horde villainess Catra being the sole exception). The new main villain Hordak ("ruthless leader of the Evil Horde") was followed in action-figure form by his underlings, Mantenna ("evil spy with the pop-out eyes"), Leech ("evil master of power suction", with suction-cup hands and mouth), Grizzlor ("hairy henchman of the Evil Horde", with actual imitation fur), and Modulok ("evil beast with a thousand bodies"; a unique figure with 22 segmented body parts that could be taken apart and reassembled into more than 1,000 different combinations). Hordak's lair, the Fright Zone, was also released as a playset in 1985, although it bore no resemblance at all to the mechanical-/industrial-looking Fright Zone seen in the animated She-Ra series.

Series four of the mini comics in 1985 began to depart from some aspects of Filmation's continuity, as each member of the Evil Horde appeared in their own titular mini comic, focusing more on their attempts to attack He-Man and invade Eternia rather than anything She-Ra/Princess of Power–related. Likewise, Skeletor's dragon-blaster and He-Man's thunder-punch powers were never seen in the animated series, but debut here in the mini comics Skeletor's Dragon and The Treachery of Modulok. Roboto also received an alternate origin story in The Battle of Roboto, being a creation of Man-At-Arms rather than a wandering alien, as in the Filmation series. Stinkor and Spikor starred in their own mini comics as well, in The Stench of Evil and Spikor Strikes, which also included Moss Man, Sy-Klone (referred to as "Tornado"), and the Spydor vehicle. Only the mini comic The Obelisk followed the established continuity more closely and did not feature any of the new characters or vehicles. Michael Halperin and Christy Marx wrote many of the 1984 and 1985 mini comics, while Lee Nordling often served as editor. Larry Houston, Michael Lee, and Alfred Alcala composed most of the artwork for these issues, while DC Comics' Bruce Timm was the illustrator for Grizzlor - The Legend Comes Alive!

The introduction of She-Ra and The Secret of the Sword animated feature (1985)

In 1984, Mattel and Filmation decided to diversify the Masters of the Universe line beyond its traditional realm of "male action," in the hopes of bringing in a young female audience as well. Thus, She-Ra, a feminine warrior-woman heroine, in the same vein as He-Man, was proposed with an all new line of dolls/action figures for girls. In conjunction with the toy line, Filmation would begin work on a new animated series titled She-Ra: Princess of Power, featuring this new main character. She-Ra would be revealed as Princess Adora, the long-lost twin sister of Prince Adam/He-Man, living on Eternia's sister planet of Etheria, ruled by Hordak, the main antagonist of the new series and the tyrannical leader of the Evil Horde. She-Ra would first be introduced in the animated feature He-Man and She-Ra: The Secret of the Sword, released in theaters on March 22, 1985. The film would feature most major characters from He-Man and the Masters of the Universe and introduce many of the new characters and concepts behind the new series (with the backstory developed by Filmation writers Larry DiTillio and J. Michael Straczynski).

She-Ra: Princess of Power – Filmation animated series (1985–87)

Filmation's She-Ra: Princess of Power first aired "The Sword of She-Ra Part 1: Into Etheria" on September 9, 1985. The Secret of the Sword animated movie from earlier that spring was essentially a compilation of what would become the first five episodes of the She-Ra cartoon series. The series would run for two seasons, 93 episodes, from 1985 to 1987. She-Ra: Princess of Power was produced in lieu of continuing He-Man and the Masters of the Universe for a third year; however, He-Man often appeared in episodes of She-Ra to aid his sister, and several other characters from He-Man and the Masters of the Universe, both heroic and evil, also appeared in multiple crossovers.

She-Ra was born as Princess Adora on Eternia, Prince Adam/He-Man's twin sister and daughter of King Randor and Queen Marlena. As an infant, Adora is kidnapped by Hordak (vampire/demon-faced sorcerer with a cowl of bones, who can transform his body into various mechanical devices) and Skeletor (Hordak's apprentice at the time) and taken to the world of Etheria (a planet ruled by the Horde, and the main setting of the She-Ra series). Adora is raised and brainwashed by Hordak and his confidant Shadow Weaver (a red-robed witch with a hidden face, powerful in dark magic), to eventually become Force Captain of the Horde. After encountering her brother He-Man (who is on a mission from the Sorceress to find her on Etheria), she eventually acquires the Sword of Protection and seeks to learn the true evil of the Horde. After first transforming into She-Ra and seeing the error of her ways, she becomes a member of the Great Rebellion; a secret small band of rebels, living in the Whispering Woods and fighting to free Etheria from the tyrannical rule of Hordak. Just as Prince Adam transforms into He-Man with the use of his Sword of Power, Adora transforms into She-Ra via her Sword of Protection, a replica of He-Man's sword featuring a smooth blue gem in its hilt. Unlike He-Man's sword, She-Ra's possesses the ability to transform into different weapons and accessories, such as a lasso, a shield, or a flaming blade. Like her brother Adam, however, Adora's transformation into She-Ra is similarly triggered by holding her sword over her head, but with her own unique invocation: "For the honor of Grayskull…I am She-Ra!" Also similar to He-Man and Cringer/Battle Cat, She-Ra transforms her horse Spirit into the flying unicorn Swift Wind. Though strong like He-Man, She-Ra is shown to have additional powers as well, such as the ability to heal with her touch and communicate with animals via telepathy.

The premise of the She-Ra TV series was the reverse of the He-Man cartoon, where the heroes are actually rebels countering an evil establishment (rather than Skeletor trying to conquer Eternia). The Great Rebellion is originally led by Queen Angela (winged queen of Bright Moon, freed by She-Ra from the clutches of Hunga the Harpy) and her daughter Glimmer (pink-haired magic user with the ability to manipulate light), with the main cast of the Princess of Power cartoon also including the skilled archer Bow (the main male heroic character of the series), Bow's timid companion Kowl (a flying owl-/koala-like creature with large rainbow-colored ears), and the absent-minded magician Madame Razz and her wise-cracking sidekick, Broom. Also appearing in many episodes are the small imp-like forest-dwelling Twiggits (mainly Sprockett, Spritina, and Spragg) and the mystical Light Hope, who serves as a "Sorceress of Grayskull–type" guide to She-Ra, residing high atop Mount Skydancer in the Crystal Castle. Throughout the series, recurring characters and members/allies of the Rebellion included Adora's swashbuckling love interest Sea-Hawk, the flirtatious ice queen Frosta, powerful sorcerer queen Castaspella, the mermaid princess Mermista, flower-loving Perfuma, net-tossing Netossa, far-seeing Peekablue, butterfly-like Flutterina, and the intergalactic scout Sweet Bee. With the He-Man and the Masters of the Universe cartoon no longer in production, MOTU toy-line characters also appeared in the She-Ra series, such as the elephant warrior Snout Spout (referred to as "Hose Nose"), and the Comet Warriors Rokkon and Stonedar. A special character, Loo-Kee, was also introduced, hiding somewhere in the background of nearly every episode of the series; emerging at the end of the episode, revealing to viewers where he had been hiding and relating the moral of the story.

The ruling antagonist faction of the series, the Evil Horde (whose members are often depicted with a bat-like insignia), is led on Etheria by Hordak (as voiced by George DiCenzo, portrayed with a snorting laugh and temperament slightly more fearsome than Skeletor's), who rules Etheria from the industrial-/technological-looking monstrosity known as the Fright Zone. The Horde enslaves the people of Etheria through Hordak's legions of armored robot-like Horde Troopers, mechanized vehicles, and his special task force of henchman known as the Force Squad. The Force Squad, lead originally by Adora and now by Catra (raven-haired villainess with a magic mask, giving her the ability to turn into a vicious panther), consists of the bug-eyed Mantenna (whom Hordak loves to torment, often dropping him through trapdoors), the fearsome Beast Island operator Grizzlor, the hulking life-force-draining amphibian-like Leech, the whiny shape-shifting Imp, and the pincer-clawed scorpion woman Scorpia. The Horde was later joined by others, including Skeletor's former scientist henchman Modulok, his robotic creation Multi-Bot, the future Snake Men Tung-Lashor and Rattlor, Entrapta the evil inventor with deadly braids, the octopus woman Octavia, the Horde zookeeper Vultak, and the robot Horde Trooper commander Dylamug. The overarching interplanetary supreme leader of the Horde, Horde Prime, who held leadership over both Hordak and Skeletor, was also introduced during the She-Ra Filmation series. Some of the other popular one-off heroes and villains were Spinnerella, Huntara, General Sunder, False-Face, Colonel Blast, the Red Knight, Granita the comet warrior, Sorrowful the Dragon, the Meteorbs, and the Star Sisters.

She-Ra and Adora were voiced in the series by Melendy Britt (who also voiced Catra, Castaspella, Mermista, and Octavia); George DiCenzo was the voice of Hordak, Bow, Sea-Hawk, Tung-Lashor, and a few others; and Diane Pershing provided the voice for Netossa and Spinnerella. Alan Oppenheimer and John Erwin would reprise their roles from the He-Man and the Masters of the Universe series, as would Linda Gary with Teela and the Sorceress, while providing additional voice work for Glimmer, Madame Razz, Sweet Bee, Shadow Weaver, Scorpia, and Entrapta. Credited as "Erik Gunden," Lou Scheimer returned as well to provide voices for a plethora of characters, including Swift Wind, Kowl, Light Hope, Broom, Mantenna, Leech, Grizzlor, Modulok, Horde Prime, Multi-Bot, Rattlor, Orko, the Horde Troopers, and many of the Twiggits; while his daughter, Erika Scheimer, took a more prominent role in this series, providing the voices for Loo-Kee, Queen Angella, Frosta, Imp, and several of She-Ra's female associates. She-Ra: Princess of Power would air its final episode, "Swifty's Baby," on December 12, 1987, with no real finale for either the She-Ra or He-Man Filmation series.

Princess of Power – Mattel toy line (1985–87)

Released in 1985, Mattel's toy line Princess of Power (sometimes abbreviated as POP) featured almost exclusively female characters, all of whom featured an emphasis on hair and clothing, with "real" hair and partially soft-goods costumes. Described as "fashion action dolls," essentially the line attempted to fuse the appeal of Masters of the Universe with Mattel's successful line of fashion dolls, Barbie, and added many "Fantastic Fashions" clothing accessories packs to complement the female action figures.

The 1985 line of Princess of Power figures included She-Ra (without a separate action figure for Princess Adora), Bow (the only male figure in the POP line, without his moustache, as seen in the cartoon series), Glimmer ("the guide who lights the way"), Kowl ("the know-it owl"), Angella ("angelic winged guide"), Frosta ("ice empress of Etheria"), Castaspella ("enchantress who hypnotizes"), Catra ("jealous beauty" and the main female antagonist), and Double Trouble ("glamorous double agent"; created only for the toy line and mini comics, never appearing in the Filmation cartoon series). She-Ra's main playset was Crystal Castle, a "shimmering castle of fantasy and fun for She-Ra and her friends!" Enchanta, a large swan creature/vehicle, was also produced in the first wave of toys, as were several horses to accompany the figures: Swift Wind for She-Ra, Arrow for Bow, and Storm for Catra.

The Princess of Power toy line ran from 1985 to 1987, for which Mattel would release a total of 22 action figure/dolls (with 12 creatures, two playsets, and 16 clothing accessories). Apart from the main Princess of Power line, the preeminent villains of the She-Ra series, Hordak and the Evil Horde (originally created by Filmation in collaboration with Mattel), were released by Mattel under the Masters of the Universe branding. The character Catra was the only villain to be released in the first wave of the Princess of Power figures, with Mattel downplaying her connection to the Evil Horde in the toy line. In 1986, a new "Scratchin' Sound" version of Catra was joined by her feline pet Clawdeen and fellow Horde-Villainess Entrapta. She-Ra (with a new "Starburst" version) was accompanied in the second wave by her allies Flutterina, Mermista, Peekablue, Perfuma, and Sweet Bee. "Crystal" translucent plastic versions of Swift Wind and the horses Sun Dancer and Moonbeam were also released in wave two, along with the Butterflyer and Sea Harp creature/vehicles and the Crystal Falls playset.

The third and final wave saw diminished sales and production in 1987, with the releases of Netossa, Spinnerella, and Loo-Kee; along with "Bubble Power" She-Ra, "Royal" Swift Wind, "Silver" Storm, and "Shower Power" Catra. Several recurring characters from the She-Ra cartoon did not receive action figures in either the original POP or MOTU toy lines—such as Madame Razz (or her Broom), Light Hope, the Twiggits, Sea-Hawk, Shadow Weaver, Scorpia, Imp, Octavia, or Hunga the Harpy, though nearly all of these omitted (from the original toy-lines)characters would receive action figures in the 2008-2016 produced Masters of The Universe Classics revival line for collectors. She-Ra would also feature in 13 of her own mini comics (packaged with the figures), along with several children's books, comic magazines, and read-along record/cassette-tape books.

Last years of the original toy line

Final action figures and mini comics (1986–88)
The final series of action figures and mini comics, in 1986 and 1987, would continue on the adventures past the animated series and its sequel in the She-Ra line, introducing new characters not seen in the cartoon series such as the heroic warriors: Rio Blast ("transforming gunslinger"), Clamp Champ ("master of capture"), and Extendar ("master of extension"); the evil warriors: Blast-Attak ("blast-apart robotic warrior"), Ninjor ("evil ninja warrior"), and Scare-Glow ("evil ghost of Skeletor"); the Snake Men: King Hiss ("dreadful disguised leader of the Snake Men"), Sssqueeze ("evil long-armed viper"), and Snake-Face ("most gruesome of the Snake Men"); the Hordesmen: Dragstor ("transforming warrior/vehicle") and Mosquitor ("energy-draining insectoid"); and the spinning-top-like Energy Zoids: Rotar and Twistoid. Aside from these new characters, longtime MOTU staple characters King Randor ("heroic ruler of Eternia") and the Sorceress ("heroic guardian of Castle Grayskull") were finally represented in action-figure form. Other later MOTU characters that had only appeared in the She-Ra: Princess of Power animated series also saw release in the form of the elephant-headed Snout Spout ("heroic water-blasting firefighter"); the rock warriors: Rokkon ("young heroic comet warrior") and Stonedar ("heroic rock people leader"); the Snake Men: Tung Lashor ("evil tongue-shooting Snake Men creature") and Rattlor ("evil Snake Men creature with the quick-strike head"); and the Horde members: Multi-Bot ("evil robot of a thousand bodies", similar to the prior interchangeable body-segment Modulok figure) and the Horde Trooper ("evil collapsing robot" and the only generic troop/soldier figures of the toy line). New versions of the lead characters were also produced, with "Flying Fists" He-Man, "Terror Claws" Skeletor, and Hordak in two new forms ("Hurricane" Hordak and "Buzz-Saw" Hordak).

The Evil Horde obtained their first vehicle/creatures in the toy line with Mantisaur ("the evil insectoid steed") and Monstroid ("the ultimate battling monster", that had an entirely different depiction in the animated series); while the Horde's Slime Pit playset (a dinosaur-skull-headed torture device) proved to be quite popular in 1986, coming complete with canisters of green ooze to pour over the action figures, while held in place with a giant claw. Also that same year, "the land and sky disc launcher", Blaster Hawk, and "the road rocket", Laser Bolt, were produced for He-Man's heroic warriors; while Skeletor gained the "dragonfly attack vehicle", known as the Fright Fighter. At a less expensive price point, several accessory packs of smaller vehicle/weapons included the Megalaser, Jet Sled, and Stilt Stalkers in 1986; and the Scubattack, Tower Tools, Cliff Climber, Beam Blaster, and Artilleray set and several small transforming egg-shaped creatures, known as Meteorbs, late into the line in 1987.

Also late into the line in 1987 were three original characters from the live-action movie: Blade ("evil masters of swords"), Saurod ("evil spark-shooting reptile"), and Gwildor ("heroic creator of the Cosmic Key"), with their entry into the MOTU mythos explained in one of the last original mini comics, The Cosmic Key. No other movie-related figures were produced; however, in 1988, the final action figures of the original toy line, the "Laser Power" versions of He-Man and Skeletor, did bear some resemblance to their live-action movie counterparts and were released only to European markets.

One of the main storylines of the later mini comics, released with these later waves of action figures, was the introduction of a new major villain faction known as the Snake Men, first appearing in the mini comic King of the Snake Men. Kobra Khan, Tung-Lashor, and Rattlor (who previously appeared in the He-Man and She-Ra cartoon series with Skeletor, and/or as members of the Horde), were now under the leadership of the ancient Eternian King Hiss, whose Snake Men army rose from Eternia's past, joining forces with Skeletor to once again rule Eternia (additional Snake Men were later added to the roster in the form of the long-armed Sssqueeze and the medusa-like Snake Face in the mini comic Revenge of the Snake Men). Another major mini comic storyline of this period included the introduction of the three-towered fortress of Eternia in The Ultimate Battleground, which was a massive final playset for MOTU, one of the biggest of all 1980s toy lines, complete with a motorized monorail circling the towers. Other notable mini comics included the debut of Hordak's gruesome mind-altering Slime Pit in Escape from the Slime Pit, one of several origin stories for Rokkon and Stonedar in Rock People to the Rescue, cybernetic Horde experiments resulting in the creation of the warriors Dragstor and Extendar in The Warrior Machine, and the suggested origin of Skeletor as Keldor in The Search for Keldor (which also included the only mini comic appearances for He-Man's ally Clamp Champ, and Skeletor's minions Ninjor, Scare Glow, and Faker). All of this was leading toward what would have been a continuation of the series in "The Powers of Grayskull" line, before being discontinued. These series five and six mini comics were often edited by Lee Nordling with art direction from Ron Cook, and included writing by Tim Kiplin, Phil White, and Steven Grant, with the artwork of Bruce Timm, Jim Mitchell, Chris Carlson, Charles Simpson, and Larry Houston, among others.

The Powers of Grayskull (1987)
The proposed exploration of the distant past of Eternia, dubbed "Preternia," forms the basis of what was originally to be the next incarnation of the toy line, entitled "The Powers of Grayskull." However the toy line was canceled very early on, with only a few toys released (like the dinosaur-themed creatures Turbodactyl, Bionatops, Tyrantisaurus Rex, and the rare Italian-only-released giant figures Tytus and Megator). The main story information originates from the final mini comic The Powers of Grayskull—The Legend Begins!, which was intended as the first of a three-part series; however, only this issue appeared.

The proposed storyline was to focus on Ancient Eternia, which was populated by many creatures, including the aforementioned cybernetic dinosaurs and giants. When the Sorceress and He-Man arrive, followed by Skeletor, they find King Hiss leading an attack on a village in the hope of drawing out "The Elders," using some of the cybernetic dinosaurs to their advantage. Hiss serves an "unnamed one" and agrees to unite with Skeletor on the basis that he might be an emissary. Seeing Skeletor's interference, the Sorceress allows He-Man to enter the battle but, "for reasons that will be made clear to you in the future," he had to be disguised. He finds himself overwhelmed, but then a shadowy figure appears who turns the odds with a powerful wand. The stranger then sends the Snake Men back to their base and all the time travelers home. The Sorceress describes the intervener as "the Greatest Sorcerer of all" and He-Man is left asking, "But who is he?" No further story information is given and it remains unclear how the giants mentioned and released as toys would fit into the story. However, some marketing press releases and prototypes have shed further information on this.

The wizard was to be He-Ro, an ancestor of He-Man. Raised by his mentor Eldor and discovering special powers in a cave, He-Ro would have led the fight against the Snake Men. According to the mini comics' writers, it was intended that the central antagonist would be Keldor, a character revealed similarly late in the line to have been He-Man's uncle and also strongly hinted to have been the former identity of Skeletor. Whether or not Keldor was also supposed to be the "Unnamed One" Hiss served is not clear, although in an interview writer Steven Grant vaguely recalls that the intention was that the Unnamed One would be a greater evil who, as the Emperor was to Darth Vader, was intended to be the one who caused Keldor to become Skeletor.

Home Video

On April 25, 2022, the complete series was released for the first time on DVD in the UK by Fabulous Films.

Other comics, books, and media

Marvel comics, daily newspaper strips, and fan-club magazines (1985–88)

In the years after the animated series ended, generally going along with the established Filmation continuity, Marvel Comics would release a younger-skewing Star Comics Masters of the Universe series that ran from 1986 to 1988 bimonthly and produced 13 issues; featuring many of the later characters introduced in the toy line, as well as new ones such as Lieutenant Andra. Apart from the standard comic-book format, there was a He-Man and the Masters of the Universe Magazine, a U.S.-based fan-club magazine featuring puzzles, fan letters, feature stories, and comic strips (running 16 issues, 1985–88; She-Ra also with a similar magazine, running six issues). This magazine series featured well-rendered covers and posters by artist Earl Norem and a create a character contest, with the winner, Nathan Bitner, revealed in the spring 1986 issue. Bitner's creation, Fearless Photog, was never realized in the 1980s and an action figure was not produced until the Masters of the Universe Classics collector's toy line in 2012.

Daily Masters of the Universe comic strips were also in newspaper syndication from 1985 until 1989. The strips were primarily written by Chris Weber and edited by Karen Willson, with distribution in the U.S. and worldwide in countries such as Brazil, India, Greece, and the former Yugoslavia. The newspaper strips were generally lesser known to the wider fan base until 1,639 of the 1,674 daily strips were finally collected in hardcover format with He-Man and the Masters of the Universe: The Newspaper Comic Strips, released by Dark Horse Books in 2017.

International publications (1983–90)
Various comics and magazines containing Masters of the Universe–related content were also released outside the United States, in the United Kingdom, Germany, France (as Musclor et les Maîtres de l'univers), Finland, Argentina, Brazil, Spain, Italy, and several other countries in the late 1980s. One of the most notable was produced by Egmont's London Editions in the United Kingdom, which published 72 issues biweekly of their By The Power Of Grayskull…Masters Of The Universe comic magazine from 1986 to 1988. The series was headed by Brian Clarke, and is often noted for in-depth stories expanding the canon and the origins of many Masters of the Universe characters. In addition, London Editions would introduce several new characters, such as "Scrollos," who served as an in-universe editor and guide to the series. From issue 50 onward, the series would begin to reprint many translated and reworked versions of Ehapa's German Language comics, although original content was still produced for "the Secret Files of Scrollos" portion of the comic magazine until its demise in late 1988. Fourteen issues of For the Honor of Grayskull She-Ra were also produced by London Editions from 1986 to 1987, as were several one-shot special issues, which included a dual He-Man and She-Ra feature-length adventure in Twins of Power. Starting in 1987, London Editions added a second larger monthly comic magazine entitled Masters of the Universe Adventure, which ran for 18 issues before turning into a New Adventures themed magazine He-Man Adventure for six more issues, before ending the series with four final issues in a best-of format of reprints in 1991.

Original comic-book content was created in Germany as well, first by Interpart/Condor for 18 issues from 1984 to 1987, then in Egmont's Ehapa Masters of the Universe comics for 21 issues from 1987 to 1989, with promotional content also appearing in several German Micky Maus comics from the time period. Both the German and British comics were often translated to provide content for other countries (although Italy's Più and Magic Boy magazines provided some original material, as did various South American publishers, notably Estrela and Editora Abril in Brazil). In addition, a few promotional comics and mini comics were also produced by Mattel for various European department stores, often featuring reworked versions of existing comic stories, with few exceptions.

Children's books (1983–90)
Masters of the Universe and the Princess of Power featured in many children's books from the 1980s, with one of the main producers of these titles, Golden Books, publishing several series of hard and softcover children's books from 1983 to 1986. The first few releases of the Golden books material is more in line with the early Mattel mini comics, with the later books following the Filmation cartoon series. New elements were also introduced by Golden Books, notably the character of Goat-Man in the book Secret of the Dragon's Egg in 1985. World I.P. also produced annual Masters of the Universe and Princess of Power storybooks in the UK from 1984 until the New Adventures line in 1990. Most World I.P. storybooks would loosely follow the established Filmation continuity, although the 1984 annual edition was written in a pre-Filmation style, naming prominent characters Orko and King Randor as "Gorpo" and "King Miro," respectively. Euredif France produced several Maîtres de l'Univers volumes as well, almost all of them directly based on various episodes of Filmation's He-Man and the Masters of the Universe series. Also notable in the 1980s were the various combination book, record, and cassette tape read-along adventure stories. These included many small hardcover book and cassette tapes produced by Ladybird Books out of the UK, several record and tape read-along book sets from Kid Stuff Records in the U.S., and two book and audio adventures by Mattel, packed in with a rare action-figure two-pack and with the Point Dread and Talon Fighter playset.

Games, audio plays, Power Tour, and other media (1983–87)
Several video game adaptations of the franchise were released from 1983 through to 1987. Masters of the Universe: The Power of He-Man was released by Intellivision for Atari 2600 and Intellivision in 1983. Two games, Masters of the Universe: The Arcade Game and Masters of the Universe: The Super Adventure, were developed by Adventure Soft and released by U.S. Gold for Amstrad CPC, BBC Micro, Commodore 64, and ZX Spectrum in 1987, although the Commodore 64 version of Masters of the Universe: The Arcade Game was retitled Masters of the Universe: The Ilearth Stone. A video game based on the 1987 live-action movie, Masters of the Universe: The Movie, was released by Gremlin Graphics for Amstrad CPC, Commodore 64, MSX, and ZX Spectrum also in 1987. Additionally, various Masters of the Universe board games were released throughout the 1980s, and role-playing game publisher FASA produced The Masters of the Universe Role Playing Game in 1985 with sets of die-cast miniatures created by Grenadier Models.

Throughout the 1980s, a wide array of He-Man merchandise was released, including coloring books, activity books, Panini Sticker books, toothbrush holders, costumes, bed sheets, and many other items. Several read-along audio plays were created by Kid Stuff and by Pickwick/Ladybird in the United Kingdom. Notably, a complete Masters of the Universe audio-play adventure LP record was released by Kid Stuff Records in 1983, written and produced by John Braden, with a new He-Man theme song and original voice acting. Also notable were a series of audio cassettes, released in Germany by Europa, consisting of 37 episodes of more than 40 minutes in length, with an additional 10 Princess of Power tapes, and six specials. These cassettes would continue to add to the expanding Masters of the Universe mythos, introducing the world of Anti-Eternia, with an evil alternate universe version of He-Man.

Home video releases of Filmation's animated series were produced by RCA/Columbia on VHS and Betamax for 11 volumes with red framed box art, before switching to their Magic Window brand with The Secret of the Sword movie in 1985, for 12 additional He-Man and the Masters of the Universe volumes and 10 She-Ra: Princess of Power VHS releases. Golden Books, Germany's Ocean and Select, and various others also released Masters of the Universe video content in the 1980s.

A Masters of the Universe "Power Tour" live stage show toured across the United States and Canada in 1987, with 19 consecutive performances at New York's Radio City Music Hall. Directed by Tony Christopher, husband-and-wife team Jack and Leslie Wadsworth portrayed He-Man and She-Ra, while Khalos Planchart and Eric Van Baars played lead villains Hordak and Skeletor, respectively. The production also featured lesser used characters such as Rio-Blast, Clamp-Champ, Snout-Spout, Rokkon, Ninjor, Blast-Attak, and songs by an original character, Songster (performed by Doug Howard).

Live-action Masters of the Universe film (1987)

In 1987, a live-action He-Man film was made by Cannon Films entitled Masters of the Universe, released in the United States on August 7, 1987. The film was directed by Gary Goddard and starred Dolph Lundgren in the title role of He-Man, Frank Langella as Skeletor, with Courteney Cox, Robert Duncan McNeill, and James Tolkan in supporting roles (as Julie Winston, Kevin Corrigan, and Detective Lubic, respectively). The other characters from the original cartoon to appear in the film are Evil-Lyn (Meg Foster), Man-At-Arms (Jon Cypher), Teela (Chelsea Field), Beast Man (Tony Carroll), and the Sorceress (Christina Pickles). A new character, Gwildor (Billy Barty), is included in place of Orko, as the special effects of the time were deemed insufficient and too costly. Skeletor's henchmen Blade (Anthony De Longis), Saurod (Pons Maar), and Karg (Robert Towers) were also introduced, in place of other more familiar villains from the established continuity, such as Tri-Klops, Mer-Man, and Trap Jaw.

In the film, Skeletor has finally conquered Eternia after stealing the Cosmic Key from the locksmith Gwildor, allowing him to gain entry into Castle Grayskull and imprison the Sorceress. The heroes He-Man, Man-At-Arms, and Teela are joined by Gwildor and escape to the planet Earth using Gwildor's prototype Cosmic Key. Stranded on Earth, they are faced with the task of retrieving their Cosmic Key (which has fallen into the hands of the unwitting humans Julie Winston and Kevin Corrigan) and returning to Eternia, before Skeletor can gain the full power of Castle Grayskull. Skeletor sends his minions to Earth with the mission of recovering the Cosmic Key prototype, as the war between good and evil is transferred to Earth, before returning to Eternia for a final battle between He-Man and a golden-clad godlike Skeletor in the film's climax.

Numerous parts of the previously accepted history of the series are omitted in the film, including all references to Prince Adam, Battle Cat, Orko, King Randor, and Queen Marlena. Many reviews of the motion picture criticized its departures from the cartoon, although the movie was produced as an adaptation of the toys only, with Filmation having no involvement in the film. It is also implied that Castle Grayskull itself is the ruling point of Eternia rather than any royal city. The story concentrates more on the science-fiction elements of the franchise rather than the fantasy and the majority of the story takes place on Earth rather than on the world of Eternia. Also departing from all other depictions, He-Man uses a gun in some scenes, instead of his Power Sword, and he is rarely shown displaying his superhuman strength in the film. Although He-Man twice utters his catchphrase "I have the power!" while holding the sword aloft in the iconic manner, he does omit the prefacing clause "By the power of Grayskull."

The film was a critical and commercial failure, and received negative reviews, and is often considered to be the one of the worst films ever made.

Although Mattel had hoped that the movie would boost sales of the toy line, it instead had little effect on the line's falling sales, and the MOTU toy line was finally discontinued in early 1988 under mounting financial difficulties. A sequel to the film was written, but by 1989 Cannon Films was in such severe financial troubles that it could no longer afford to pay the license fees to Mattel. Due to film's poor reception, thus the script was transformed into the action film Cyborg, starring Jean-Claude Van Damme.

The New Adventures of He-Man (1990–91)

In 1990, a couple of years after the ending of the original Masters of the Universe product line, a second He-Man animated series titled The New Adventures of He-Man was created by Jetlag Productions to promote Mattel's short-lived attempt to revive the MOTU brand with a new toy line, simply titled He-Man. The new series is radically different from the original fantasy-oriented milieu, shifting to an almost purely science-fiction setting that sees He-Man transported to the futuristic planet of Primus. He-Man (with a new, more slender appearance and sporting a ponytail; voiced by Doug Parker) leads the heroic Galactic Guardians; while Skeletor (also with a completely new look; voiced by Campbell Lane), bases himself on the mutant world of Denebria, forming an alliance with Flogg and his band of Evil Mutants, who are hellbent on conquering Primus for themselves. The series contains continuity links to the original Masters of the Universe and was intended as a continuation of the existing mythology, although some fans see it as a separate canon from the original series due to the differences in style and character portrayal.

Other than He-Man and Skeletor, the Sorceress of Castle Grayskull is the only character from the original series to make regular appearances in the new series, acting as a spiritual guide to He-Man from afar. Other established characters featured in the pilot episode, "A New Beginning," include King Randor and Queen Marlena, who finally learn of the dual identity of Prince Adam and He-Man. Teela also makes a later appearance in the series in the episode "Once Upon a Time," although she bears little resemblance to her former Filmation counterpart.

Main characters introduced in this series are He-Man's new allies: the wise sage Master Sebrian, his assistant Mara, and the lead Galactic Guardians Captain Hydron and Flipshot. Other frequently appearing heroic characters include the young shepherd girl Drissi, her little brother Caz, the scientists (Alcon, Gepple, Krex, and Meldoc), the robots Gleep and UR, Grot the gardener, councilman Werban, the cyclops Meliac, and the remaining Galactic Guardians: Sagitar, Tuskador, Spinwit, and Artilla; with the final members Kayo, Vizor, and Nocturna rarely featuring in the show (although they did appear in the comics and series intro). Skeletor's allies in Flogg's band of Evil Mutants consist mainly of Flogg's incompetent second-in-command Slush-Head, Skeletor's new love interest Crita, and other mutants such as Quakke, Staghorn, B.H., Hoove, Karatti, Optik, and Lizorr.

The New Adventures of He-Man cartoon series first aired September 17, 1990, lasting 65 episodes, until the episode "The Final Invasion," which aired on December 14, 1990, and, unlike Filmation, did provide some closure to the series. The majority of the cartoon episodes were written by Jack Olesker, resulting in a somewhat tighter continuity than the prior series. The He-Man toy line, debuting in 1989, a year earlier than the animated series, featured four waves of action figures (produced in slightly smaller scale to the previous line); totaling 28 distinct figures in all, with seven vehicles, two playsets, and two accessory items. Neither The New Adventures animated series or toy line proved nearly as popular as the originals, and the line ended with little fanfare in 1992.

The New Adventures of He-Man series was also featured in its own series of four mini comics and in a monthly comic magazine entitled He-Man Adventure, which ran for about six issues, before returning to adventures on Eternia and was published by Egmont's London Editions Magazines in the UK; World I.P. also produced a New Adventures–themed annual in 1990. These publications differed somewhat from the animated series with the addition of the character Darius (who did not appear in the cartoon series) in a major role as leader of the Galactic Council; the transition of the "Power of Castle Grayskull" into the Starship Eternia; and several of the figures sporting alternate names in some media and toy-line releases, such as Flipshot as Icarius, Flogg as Brakk, and Slush-Head as Kalamarr.

Hiatus – Proposed series, pop culture, and commemorative releases (1992–01)
The Masters of the Universe franchise would not produce any new media for over a decade, although a new series was pitched by Lou Scheimer to DIC Entertainment in 1996. The series was to feature He-Ro (alter-ego Dare), now the son of He-Man, as a sequel to the original animated series, but remained unproduced.

During this hiatus, Masters of the Universe also began a following on the early days of the internet, with sites developed by Kevin Herbert (one of the first), Adam Tyner (with the Scrolls of Grayskull newsletter), Busta-Toons (with focus on the Filmation animated series), and many others; eventually ending up with the expansive He-Man.org site being created. Various popular internet memes were also created, with Masters of the Universe being reviewed by popular YouTube channels and parodies such as Unemployed Skeletor or Wil Wheaton's "Skeletor Reads Angry Tweets" segment. Masters of the Universe would also appear many times on the Adult Swim stop-motion comedy series Robot Chicken (which introduced comedic character Mo-Larr). Both He-Man and Skeletor are often mentioned in pop culture, as seen on the long-running animated series The Simpsons on a few occasions.

In 2000, however, Mattel did act on the growing nostalgia for the 1980s action figures by rereleasing replicas of many of the figures, under the banner of the Masters of the Universe Commemorative line. BCI Eclipse LLC (and later Mill Creek Entertainment) would expand on this, later releasing all episodes of the Filmation He-Man and the Masters of the Universe on DVD in Region 1 in 2005/2006; followed by She-Ra: Princess of Power and JetLag's New Adventures of He-Man series. Each volume contained an extensive array of special features, including original documentaries produced for the DVD set that featured interviews from many series creators and writers such as Lou Scheimer, Larry DiTillio, Paul Dini, and others.

Early 2000s Masters of the Universe franchise relaunch (2002–04)

200X Masters of the Universe toy line
In 2002, Mattel launched a new Masters of the Universe toy line with sculpts designed by the Four Horsemen. The new toy line was made surprisingly faithful to the original line, with the characters gently "reimagined" and updated in terms of sculpting detail rather than radically reinterpreted. Sixty action figures were released in all, with 10 creature figures, seven vehicles, and three playsets (eight smaller-scale figures were also produced in a McDonald's Happy Meal promotion).

One point of contention for many fans of the original Masters toy line was the redesign of He-Man's Power Sword. According to Four Horsemen, this was due to their original re-sculpts being intended for a continuation of the original storyline in which Skeletor had obtained both halves of the Power Sword (hence the new Skeletor figure's dual blades with clear "good" and "evil" hilt designs), necessitating a new sword to be built by Man-At-Arms and endowed with the properties of the original by the Sorceress. However, Mattel decided to reboot the continuity for a new generation of children, and thus the "new" Power Sword design became the "original" version for the new continuity. Another issue was the overreliance on releasing alternate versions of He-Man (13 in total), Skeletor (10), Man-At-Arms (5), and a few other main characters, rather than further classic, reimagined, and original characters from the accompanying animated series (such as Randor, The Sorceress, Clawful, or Chief Carnivus, to name a few); making many of the non-He-Man or Skeletor figures hard to come by for both collectors and children. These factors likely contributed to the cancelation of the line in 2004 and ultimately not achieving the success of its 1980s counterpart.

The line's faithfulness to the original series made it very popular with collectors, however, suggesting it would have been better served as a collector-based line, akin to DC Direct. This theory was borne out in the wake of the discontinuation of the mass-market toy line, with NECA taking the rather unprecedented step of continuing the toy line through action-figure-size mini-statues scaled and sculpted to be aesthetically compatible for display alongside the Mattel toys. NECA would produce 22 "staction figures" in total, allowing fans to fill in their collections with other Four Horsemen redesigned characters that had yet to be produced as figures when the toy line was canceled. According to a December 8, 2005, interview with a Mattel representative on he-man.org, NECA offered to produce fully articulated action figures for Mattel without taking any credit, but permission was denied. Instead, NECA was only permitted to produce non-articulated statues, which they did from 2005 to 2007.

2002 animated series – Mike Young Productions

A new animated series was produced to accompany the toy line, made by Mike Young Productions and lasting for 39 episodes, with the series making its premiere on Cartoon Network's Toonami on August 16, 2002, and airing its final episode on January 10, 2004. This series involved much tighter continuity and a somewhat greater depth of characterization than its Filmation predecessor. A similar but slightly modified premise to the original Filmation series, this version of He-Man (voiced by Cam Clarke, with Prince Adam portrayed as physically younger and smaller than He-Man) was part of an ensemble of Eternian heroes/protectors known officially as "The Masters of the Universe". Under the leadership of Man-At-Arms (voiced by Garry Chalk), this team originally consisted of He-Man/Adam (with his pet Cringer/Battle Cat, no longer able to speak), Teela, Orko, Stratos, Ram-Man, Mekaneck, and Man-E-Faces, and later joined by Buzz-Off, Roboto, and Sy-Klone. King Randor was now a general (rather than king, from an Eternian royal lineage), pronounced ruler of Eternia by the Elders of the Hall of Wisdom, which have gone into hiding inside the depths of Castle Grayskull. Skeletor (voiced by Brian Dobson), now confirmed as Randor's brother Keldor, finally breaks through the great barrier wall (after decades of trying) and attacks The Masters with his evil forces, mainly consisting of Evil-Lynn, Beast-Man, Mer-Man, Trap-Jaw (now a cybernetically repaired henchman, formerly known as Kronis), Tri-Klops (now an inventor/scientist, somewhat akin to an evil Man-At-Arms), Claw-ful (now a very large and extremely dim-witted thug), and Whiplash (now also of larger size and of the subterranean Caligar race). Backstories of occasional characters such as Fisto, Moss-Man, Webstor, Zodak (regarded a different character as opposed to the earlier Zodac), Two-Bad (portrayed as two bounty hunters known as Tuvar and Baddhra, magically combined into one being by Skeletor's magic), and Stinkor (finally making an appearance in cartoon continuity as the mutated form of Odiphus) are all expanded upon. On-and-off villains Count Marzo and Evilseed return, while new characters such as Dekker, Carnivus, Ceratus, Lord Dactys, Prahvus, the Faceless One, and the giants Chadzar, Belzar, and Azdar are also introduced in this series.

The series was originally title He-Man and the Masters of the Universe like the original 1983 series, being retitled Masters of the Universe vs. the Snake-Men towards the end of the first season, in addition sidelining Skeletor as chief villain in favor of King Hiss, leader of the reptilian Snake Men (Kobra-Kahn, General Rattlor, Tung-Lashor, Snake-Face, and Sssqueeze), with He-Man and many of the characters now bearing a new "Snake-Armor" look. He-Man's ancestor King Grayskull and his Sorceress wife Veena also debuted in this season against his nemesis Hordak (now an ancient sorcerer). Hordak and the Evil Horde were to be the main antagonists for the third season if the show had continued, but it was not renewed. The 40th and final episode was produced as a comic-book "special feature" on the last DVD set of the series, which was part of a three-volume release, originally by BCI Eclipse in 2008 (and later in a collected release by Mill Creek Entertainment in 2009 and 2012).

Video games (2002–05)
A game based on the second Masters of the Universe series, titled He-Man: Power of Grayskull, was developed by Taniko and published by TDK Mediactive in October 2002 for the Game Boy Advance, which also featured an introductory mini comic. A follow-up developed by Savage Entertainment and published by Midas Interactive Entertainment, He-Man: Defender of Grayskull, was released for PlayStation 2 in February 2005.

Comic series by MVC and Image Comics
From 2002 to 2005, Image Comics and MVCreations published several series of comics and one-shots that mirrored tales of Masters of the Universe; the comic series elaborated and added to the mythos by introducing characters that never appeared in the 39 episodes of the television series. The first issues were seen in the summer of 2002 in the form of special promotional/preview issues, with three miniseries continuing on after: "The Shards of Darkness" in fall 2002, followed by "Dark Reflections" and "Rise of the Snake Men" in 2003. After delving into the backstories of Skeletor's henchmen Beast-Man, Mer-Man, Trap-Jaw, and Tri-Klops in a four-issue "Icons of Evil" series, a short-lived ongoing series, solely produced by MVC, continued on for eight issues in 2004. Along with these, a handful of special or "pack-in" one-shots and trade paperback collected volumes were also produced.

Masters of the Universe Classics, Super7 & DC Comics (2008–20)

MOTU Classics (2008–20)
In 2007, a new incarnation of Masters of the Universe was announced, with the first action figure, King Grayskull, released at San Diego Comic Con 2008. Based on the look of the original 1980s MOTU toys, this new toy line was aimed primarily at the adult toy collector market with a 6" scale, and were often available only through subscriptions (from MattyCollector). Sculpted by the Four Horsemen, these toys were updated versions of previous figures, as well as characters that never before had an action figure made of them, such as Filmation's Queen Marlena, Fang-Man, Lizard-Man, Count Marzo, Granamyr, and many others. The toy line featured many redesigned and updated action figures from the original action-figure line from the 1980s, but it also included characters from She-Ra: Princess of Power (Adora, Madame Razz, Scorpia, Shadow Weaver, and others), The New Adventures of He-Man (Mara, Crita, and more), and the Mike Young Productions series from 2002 (Faceless One, Chief Carnivus, King Chooblah, Ceratus, and others). As the line progressed, characters from all versions of MOTU lore were included, from such things as prototypes and concept art (He-Ro, Eldor, Demo-Man, Gygor, Vykor, and others), box art from vehicles and model kits (Sky High and the Fighting Foe Men), mini comics (the Goddess, Geldor, and Procrustus), and other books, comics, and media (Despara, Strobo, Goat-Man, and more). There were also newly created figures, exclusive to the Classics toy line, such as Draego-Man, Cy-Chop, Castle Grayskullman, and others. Figures were also released in two-packs with corresponding Superheroes and villains from the DC Comics Universe.

Masters of the Universe Classics surpassed the original 1980s toy line in terms of length, running continuously for seven years with more than 150 different figures produced following its launch in August 2008. In 2016, Mattel ended production on the MOTU Classics and MattyCollector.com's Club Grayskull series, with the production company Super7 taking over the Masters of the Universe license; though Super7 would continue the series.

Super7 (2016–20)
Super7 produced several 3¾" figures (in the style of the classic Kenner Star Wars action figures from the late 1970s to early 1980s) and many figures in the style of the small pink M.U.S.C.L.E./Kinkeshi toylines also from the 1980s. Super7's releases included figures from their animation special The Curse of the Three Terrors, followed by the Masters of the Universe "Ultimates" line (which consisted of "deluxe" re-releases of Classics figures) and a continuation of the prior Classics and Club Grayskull lines. Super7 also produced retro figures in the form of the original 1980's line in 5½-inch scale; which included many 'Filmation' styled versions of the vintage figures, along with unreleased figures such as He-Ro and Eldor. Super7's final addition to the MOTU Classics toyline was a 'made to order' exclusive Snake Mountain playset in 2020.

Dark Horse & DC mini-comics (2012–15)
In addition to the toylines, starting in 2012, Dark Horse Comics produced mini comics included in Mattel's Masters of the Universe Classics line of toys, continuing the series of mini comics first introduced in the original MOTU toys of the 1980s. The initial three mini comics were written by Tim Seeley and drawn by Wellinton Alves, with covers by Eric Powell. The Dark Horse mini comics continue the storyline The Powers of Grayskull/Preternia that was to have been the direction the original action figure line was headed before it was canceled. In these issues, He-Man goes back in time to battle King Hiss, finally bringing He-Ro, Eldor, Tytus, and Megator into the storylines and introducing newly created Classics characters such as Sir Laser-Lot and the Mighty Spector. Seeley stated that these comics were intended to blend the different He-Man continuities and select the best stories and ideas from MOTU history.

DC took over the Masters of the Universe Classics mini comics from Dark Horse in 2013, publishing five more mini comics, with stories from Scott Neitlich and artwork by Wellinton Alves and Axel Giménez. These mini comics provide an origin story of Keldor (Skeletor), and then proceed to join into the later New Adventures of He-Man continuity. The Fall of Eternia saga in the final issues incorporates the proposed Dare, son of He-Man (He-Ro II) series from the 1990s, along with Gorpo (the Unnamed One) and many "Create-a-character" contest finalist designs from the 1980s Masters of the Universe Magazine. Many of these stories are meant to be read in conjunction with the altered continuity presented in the character biographies on the cardbacks of the Masters of the Universes Classic's line action figure packaging, and thus do not provide a detailed flowing narrative in the mini comics themselves. The 8th and final mini comic of this series was published in 2015.

DC Comics (2012–20)

A Masters of the Universe comic book series was relaunched by DC Comics in 2012, first appearing as a series of digital comics. This was quickly followed by a six-issue mini-series and all new revised origin issues for He-Man, Skeletor and Hordak. After a crossover mini-series with superheroes from the DC Comics universe in 2013, an ongoing series ran for 19 issues through 2014, before being replaced by the "He-Man The Eternity War" 15-issue series in 2015/2016. This introduced a new back-story for He-man's sister She-Ra (as Despara), Skeletor (as the half-Gar son of King Miro), Hordak, and the Snakemen; moving the storyline further along, with a new Horde invasion of Eternia and He-Man taking the Eternian throne, amongst other new developments. Fans have later referred to the overall 2012-2016 comic saga with the "Eternity War" moniker since it was all part of the same story.

Crossover Specials

Later DC/Mattel produced He-Man/ThunderCats, a crossover with another heroic 1980s action figure line, ThunderCats, was also produced for six issues in 2016–2017 and a six-part crossover series with DC Comics' Injustice Storyline was released in 2018. These two crossovers were not part of the earlier 2012-2016 DC Comics MOTU canon.

The final DC Comics MOTU property was 'He-Man and the Masters of the Multiverse', which began in November 2019, with a six issue limited series, written by Tim Seeley. This used elements from various sources in MOTU lore, vintage minicomics, '87 movie, filmation, 2002 series as well as references to "Eternity War" storyarc.

Current Masters of the Universe properties

She-Ra and the Princesses of Power (2018–20)

On December 12, 2017, DreamWorks Animation SKG and Netflix announced a new reboot series based on She-Ra Princess of Power series from the 1980s. The series was executive produced by award-winning author, ND Stevenson (creator of Nimona and Lumberjanes). The series' first season of thirteen episodes was released on Netflix November 13, 2018. The DreamWorks series features a new animation style and alternate backstories for many of the characters, many of whom are presented as younger in age and with a more diverse makeup than in the previous 1980s Filmation series. Adora/She-Ra is again presented as a former member of the Horde, befriended by re-imagined versions of Glimmer and Bow (with new voice actors Aimee Carrero, Karen Fukuhara and Marcus Scribner, respectively). Under the direction of Glimmer's mother Queen Angella of Bright Moon, the three embark upon re-uniting the Princesses of Etheria, which include Perfuma, Mermista, Entrapta and Frosta, each with re-imagined characters as well. Also appearing in the series are Swift Wind (without the alter ego of Spirit and with a completely different take on the character's personality), Light Hope (as a female hologram generated by the "First Ones"), Sea Hawk (now presented as a more comical glory-seeking associate of Mermista), Castaspella (as the sister of Angella's husband King Micah), Madame Razz (as an older and confused forest dweller with knowledge of Mara, a prior "She-Ra"), Netossa and Spinnerella.

The evil Horde returns as the villainous overlords of Etheria, and although Hordak remains leader of the Horde, Catra is often presented as the primary antagonist (now voiced by AJ Michalka), with a much stronger relationship established between her and Adora. Shadow Weaver (Lorraine Toussaint) and Scorpia (Lauren Ash) also play prominent roles within the series, and cadets Lonnie, Rogelio and Kyle are introduced (possibly inspired by previous Filmation characters). Overarching galactic villain Horde Prime and a re-imagined shape-shifting Double Trouble enter the series in later seasons, and other previously established villains appearing in lesser roles are Admiral Scurvy, Tung Lashor, Grizzlor, Imp and Octavia. Although no longer directly linked to He-Man or the Masters of the Universe, Eternia, Castle Grayskull and Adora's kidnapping as a child are referenced.

Season two of She-Ra and the Princesses of Power was released on Netflix on April 26, 2019, with a shorter seven-episode run; soon followed by season three, on August 2, and season 4, on November 4 of that same year. While firmly establishing a new continuity, these seasons make further connections to previously established lore and characters, and include Geena Davis voicing the role of Huntara in season three. The series aired its fifth and final season on May 15, 2020. Several dolls, chapter books and graphic novels were also released in relation to this series in 2019 and 2020.

New animated series – Masters of the Universe: Revelation (2021)

In August 2019, Kevin Smith announced at the 2019 Power Con that he and Netflix were developing a new series titled Masters of the Universe: Revelation that will be a direct sequel to He-Man and the Masters of the Universe.

On February 14, 2020, the full voice cast was confirmed, which includes Mark Hamill providing the voice for Skeletor, Chris Wood voicing Prince Adam and He-Man, Sarah Michelle Gellar as Teela, and Lena Headey as Evil-Lyn. The series features many characters never before seen in animated form, such as Scareglow, Blast-Attak, Andra and He-Ro; incorporating a wide range of Masters of the Universe lore over its long history and varied incarnations.

The first 5 episodes made its debut on Netflix on July 23, 2021, with the remaining 5 releasing on November 23, 2021. In June 2022, during Netflix's Geeked Week 2022, a sequel to the series titled Masters of the Universe: Revolution was announced.

Dark Horse Comics (2021)
Masters of the Universe released a prequel comic series to the Masters of the Universe Revelation animated series on Netflix, with the first issue released on July 7, 2021.

He-Man and the Masters of the Universe (2021 CGI revival)

In December 2019, it was announced that in addition to their other series, Netflix will also be developing a new Masters of the Universe series using CGI animation. With Rob David developing the series, producing it alongside Adam Bonnett, Christopher Keenan, Jeff Matsuda and Susan Corbin. Bryan Q. Miller will serve as story editor on the series. Animation services are being provided by House of Cool and CGCG Inc.

Proposed reboot film
Since 2007, a reboot of Masters of the Universe has been in the works but has gone through development hell with various studios, directors and writers connected to the project. Variety reported in 2007 that Grayskull: Masters of the Universe would be produced by Joel Silver, and written by Justin Marks, and employing visual special effects to a large degree, as was done with the 2007 war film 300.

With that deal to reboot the film going nowhere, Warner Bros. announced that John Stevenson, director of Kung Fu Panda, was slated to direct the upcoming feature. On May 12, 2009, it was announced that the scripting duties had been handed to newcomer Evan Daugherty, with John Stevenson still attached to direct.

In September 2009, Sony took over the rights from Warner Bros. to produce the Masters of the Universe live-action film after Mattel and Silver couldn't agree on creative direction for the film. Sony and Escape Artists' Todd Black, Jason Blumenthal and Steve Tisch were now developing the project from scratch for Columbia. In April 2010, Sony hired screenwriters Mike Finch and Alex Litvak to draft a new script. Deadline reported that Jon M. Chu was in talks to direct the film. Original He-Man actor Dolph Lundgren did an interview with IGN about possibly appearing in the film as King Randor.

On October 12, 2012, Richard Wenk was hired to rewrite the script for the film. On March 28, 2013, Chu said that the film was still early in its development and that it would not be campy, but rather a dramatic origin story.

On October 7, 2013, The Hollywood Reporter reported that Terry Rossio would write the film; Todd Black, Jason Blumenthal, and Steve Tisch were assigned to produce it. The film would be set on Eternia. The site also reported that Chu would not direct the film. On February 26, 2014, it was reported that directors Jeff Wadlow, Mike Cahill, Harald Zwart, and Chris McKay were on the short list to direct the film.

On April 9, 2014, Schmoes Know reported that Wadlow would direct the film, but The Hollywood Reporter announced that he was merely rewriting the script. Columbia Pictures Senior Vice President DeVon Franklin tweeted that Jeff Wadlow had completed the script. Franklin later tweeted a photo on his Twitter page of Battle Cat.

On August 19, 2015, Variety reported that Christopher Yost would rewrite the script. Mike O'Hearn announced on his Instagram account that he was in training to star as He-Man. However, he then quashed the rumor, saying he only wanted to do the part and was not cast for the live-action movie.

On January 22, 2016, Deadline reported that McG would direct the film and also oversee a rewrite of the latest script by Alex Litvak and Mike Finch, while Escape Artists' Todd Black, Jason Blumenthal and Steve Tisch and as well as DeVon Franklin were now on board as producers. On June 24, 2016, Kellan Lutz tweeted on his Twitter page that he had a meeting with both McG and Mary Viola about taking the role of He-Man. McG told IGN that the role of He-Man had not been cast yet, but that Lutz was being looked at very closely for the part. This draft of the script would be set on Eternia, but not exclusively there. In addition, pre-production had moved on to doing makeup testing. McG commented on the film saying, "I think we want to honor the fan base, first and foremost, We also need to be cognizant of the incredible resonance of what Kevin Feige is doing with Marvel, and the balance of full-bodied entertainment. That it's both credible and emotional, action-packed, and the story of a hero's journey. It's the genesis of He-Man, it's the becoming of He-Man. We want it to be clicking on all cylinders in that regard. We're not going to stop until we get it right." On April 26, 2017, Sony confirmed that the film would finally be released on December 18, 2019.

Along with the release date confirmation it was announced that McG was no longer directing the film. During the search for his replacement, Entertainment Weekly reported that David S. Goyer had been brought in to write the script. In December 2017, further reports said that Goyer was in talks to direct the film; however, in February 2018 Variety reported that Goyer had decided to step away as director to focus on other projects, but stated he would remain on board as an executive producer and screenwriter, and that the studio was said to be very happy with the script he turned in and is currently meeting with potential replacements. In April 2018, another Variety report stated that the Nee Brothers were set to direct the film.

On January 11, 2019, Deadline reported that Art Marcum and Matt Holloway would rewrite a new draft for the film. Principal photography was originally scheduled to begin on July 15, 2019, and wrap on October 18, 2019, with Prague as one of the shooting locations. On February 13, 2019, it was reported that principal photography on the film would begin in mid-July 2019 in Prague and would be directed by the Nee Brothers. On March 20, 2019, it was reported that Noah Centineo was in talks to play He-Man. On April 29, 2019, Centineo, in an appearance on The Tonight Show Starring Jimmy Fallon, confirmed that he would be playing He-Man in the upcoming film. On May 16, 2019, Sony announced that the film's release date was changed to March 5, 2021. In October 2019, The Hollywood Reporter had reported a rumor that Sony would sell the movie to Netflix. On January 24, 2020, the film has been taken off its release schedule with the film adaptation of Uncharted, which also got its release date changed, taking its place before that film changed its release date again.

On April 29, 2021, a representative for Centineo announced that he would no longer play He-Man in the film.

On January 28, 2022, it was announced that Netflix had officially acquired the film from Sony and that Kyle Allen would now play He-Man. It was also revealed that David Callaham had written a new draft of the screenplay along with the Nee Brothers, while production was set to begin in 2023.

Live-action She-Ra television series
On September 13, 2021, Amazon announced that a live-action She-Ra series is in development with DreamWorks Animation serving as an executive producer. The series will be a new, standalone story with no connections with Netflix's original animated series She-Ra and the Princesses of Power. It was announced that Nicole Kassell will direct the series.

Current Masters of the Universe toylines

Masters of the Universe Origins (2019–present)
Mattel began producing Masters of the Universe action figures once again, debuting the Origins line at the Sand Diego Comic Con in 2019 with a Prince Adam and He-Man two-pack. The figures in the vintage 5.75" scale, but with more articulation, were designed to aspire to both adult collectors and children, with a retail release across the globe in 2020. The look of the playsets, vehicles and figures, along with the packaging is presented in the style of the original line from the 1980s and include all new mini-comics. The current selection includes He-Man, Skeletor, several of their allies, She-Ra, and several members of The Evil Horde.

Masters of the Universe Minis and other modern toylines (2013–present)
Along with the MOTU Classics series, MOTU Minis and Giants figures were produced from 2013 to 2015. Mattel would bring back the Minis line in 2020 with several waves of figures, multipacks and vehicles. Mega Construx would release Masters of the Universe themed building block figures and toys, beginning in 2017, including a Castle Grayskull set.  Funko Pop has also produced Masters of the Universe themed characters since 2018.

Recent books, games and other media (2012–present)
Dark Horse Books continues to produce various hardcover anthology books with collaborative efforts from Val Staples, James Eatock, Josh de Lioncourt, Danielle Gelehrter, Eric Marshall, Jukka Issakainen, David Clark, Aidan Cross, Leanne Hannah and others. Volumes include the "Art of He-Man and the Masters of the Universe," "He-Man and the Masters of the Universe Minicomic Collection," "He-Man and She-Ra: A Complete Guide to the Classic Animated Adventures," "He-Man and the Masters of the Universe: The Newspaper Comic Strips", "He-Man and the Masters of the Universe: A Character Guide and World Compendium." and "The Toys of He-Man and the Masters of the Universe". Since 2019, Golden Books has also produced He-Man, She-Ra and Skeletor themed children's books in their Little Golden Books series.

An Android and iOS game, He-Man: The Most Powerful Game in the Universe, was developed by GlitchSoft and published by Chillingo and Mattel in late 2012; later followed by He-Man™ Tappers of Grayskull for the iOs (which also includes an updated She-Ra's Adventure version).

For many years now, fan-sites such as He-Man.org, Planet Eternia, and Wiki Grayskull, podcasts such as Masters Cast and the annual Power-Con convention, have all served and promoted the Masters of the Universe brand in recent years. Masters of the Universe was also featured in the 3rd episode of the first season of the well received Netflix series The Toys That Made Us in 2017 and in 2018 with the release of the Power of Grayskull: The Definitive History of He-Man and the Masters of the Universe documentary, also on Netflix.

Notes

References

External links
 
 

 
Mass media franchises introduced in 1981
1980s toys
1990s toys
2000s toys
2010s toys
Action figures
Mattel franchises